Vishno Datt Sharma was a member of 13th Lok Sabha representing Jammu Parliamentary Constituency of Jammu & Kashmir state in India. He was also a member of Twelfth Lok Sabha during 1998–99. He was a member of Bharatiya Janata Party. Earlier, he was president, Municipal Council, Jammu in 1972. 
Sharma was a member of the Jammu and Kashmir Legislative Assembly from the Jammu East constituency in Jammu district.

An Ayurvedic medical practitioner by profession, he was awarded fellowship of National Council for Indian System of Medicine. He died in 2001.

References

External links 
http://parliamentofindia.nic.in/lsdeb/ls13/ses8/271101.html

Bharatiya Janata Party politicians from Jammu and Kashmir
Jammu and Kashmir MLAs 1996–2002
India MPs 1999–2004
India MPs 1998–1999
People from Jammu (city)
2001 deaths
Year of birth missing
India MPs 1991–1996
Lok Sabha members from Jammu and Kashmir
Jammu and Kashmir municipal councillors
Politicians from Jammu